Langerholc is a Slovenian surname created from German Langerholz. Notable people with the surname include:

Brigita Langerholc (born 1976), Slovenian middle-distance runner 
Wayne Langerholc, American lawyer and politician

Slovene-language surnames